Greenville is a city and the county seat of Meriwether County, Georgia, United States. The population was 794 at the 2020 census, down from 876 in 2010.

History
Greenville was founded in 1828 as the seat of the newly formed Meriweather County. The city was named for Major General Nathanael Greene, commander of the rebel American forces at the Battle of Guilford Court House on March 15, 1781.

Geography
Greenville is located in central Meriwether County at  (33.027845, -84.713562). U.S. Route 27 Alternate and Georgia State Routes 109 and 100 intersect in the center of the city at the county courthouse. US 27 Alternate leads north  to Newnan and south  to Columbus, while State Route 109 leads southeast  to Woodbury and west  to LaGrange. State Route 100 leads northwest  to Hogansville.

The city drains to the south into Walnut Creek and to the east into Kennel Creek, a tributary. Walnut Creek is an east-flowing tributary of Red Oak Creek and part of the Flint River watershed.

Demographics

2020 census

As of the 2020 United States census, there were 794 people, 368 households, and 219 families residing in the city.

2000 census
As of the census of 2000, there were 946 people, 354 households, and 236 families residing in the city. The racial makeup of the city was 26.43% White, 73.15% African American, 0.11% Native American, 0.11% Pacific Islander, and 0.21% from two or more races. Hispanic or Latino of any race were 0.32% of the population.

There were 354 households, out of which 29.4% had children under the age of 18 living with them, 34.5% were married couples living together, 29.4% had a female householder with no husband present, and 33.1% were non-families. 28.5% of all households were made up of individuals, and 13.6% had someone living alone who was 65 years of age or older. The average household size was 2.67 and the average family size was 3.35.

In the city, the population was spread out, with 28.3% under the age of 18, 8.8% from 18 to 24, 28.2% from 25 to 44, 18.6% from 45 to 64, and 16.1% who were 65 years of age or older. The median age was 34 years. For every 100 females, there were 84.4 males. For every 100 females age 18 and over, there were 73.8 males.

The median income for a household in the city was $25,114, and the median income for a family was $32,500. Males had a median income of $28,750 versus $21,346 for females. The per capita income for the city was $12,997. About 21.9% of families and 26.1% of the population were below the poverty line, including 34.2% of those under age 18 and 28.7% of those age 65 or over.

Education

Meriwether County School District 
The Meriwether County School District holds pre-school to grade twelve, and consists of three elementary schools, two middle schools, and two high schools. The district has 300 full-time teachers and over 3,948 students.

George E. Washington Elementary School
Mountain View Elementary School
Unity Elementary School
Greenville Middle School
Manchester Middle School
Greenville High School
Manchester High School

Notable people
Mario Alford, wide receiver for the Cincinnati Bengals of the NFL
 Kentavious Caldwell-Pope, 2013 SEC Player of the Year and eighth overall selection in the 2013 NBA draft by the Detroit Pistons
 Lella A. Dillard, president, Georgia Woman's Christian Temperance Union
 Y. Frank Freeman, executive with Paramount Pictures
 Clara Ann Howard, Baptist missionary in Africa, longtime staff member at Spelman College
 William J. Samford, 31st governor of Alabama 
 Joseph M. Terrell, 57th governor of Georgia (October 25, 1902 – June 29, 1907); from Greenville, buried in the local cemetery
 Hiram Warner, one of the original members of the Supreme Court of Georgia, eventually becoming that court's second chief justice. Warner also held office as a circuit court judge, a representative in the Georgia General Assembly, and a U.S. congressman.
 Jontavious Willis, country blues singer, guitarist, songwriter, and multi-instrumentalist

Gallery

References

Cities in Georgia (U.S. state)
Cities in Meriwether County, Georgia
County seats in Georgia (U.S. state)